Maurizio Romano (9 March 1966 – 20 September 2003) was an Italian actor and voice actor.

Biography
Born in Cassino, Romano began his career in the 1990s. He was heavily active in his chosen field as a voice actor during that time. He was best known for providing the Italian voice of Lionel Hutz in The Simpsons. He also voiced Professor Frink from his debut appearance until the fourth season of the show. Romano dubbed certain actors in at least one or two of their movies such as Ben Affleck, John Leguizamo and Jeremy Davies. He was also the Italian voice of Tuvok in the first season of Star Trek: Voyager.

As an actor, Romano appeared in an episode of the Italian drama show Una donna per amico directed by Rossella Izzo in 1998. His career as an actor was quite short lived.

Romano was the older brother of voice actress Laura Romano.

Death
On 20 September 2003 Romano was killed in a car crash. The incident took place in Vizzolo Predabissi near Milan.

Filmography

Television
Una donna per amico (1998)

Dubbing roles

Animation
Lionel Hutz / Professor Frink (seasons 2–4) in The Simpsons
Cyberdramon in Digimon Tamers

Live action
Shannon Hamilton in Mallrats
Tybalt in William Shakespeare's Romeo + Juliet
Michael Boxer in S.W.A.T.
Tuvok in Star Trek: Voyager
Wild Bill Hickok in The Young Riders
J.D. Darius in Baywatch
Seamus in Equilibrium
Brian Lawrence in Twister
Joe Haskell / Peter Bradford in Dark Shadows
Julius Caesar in Xena: Warrior Princess
Buzz Thomas in Best Men
Noah in 28 Days Later
Frank Stolte in Alarm für Cobra 11 – Die Autobahnpolizei
Jimmy Wilder in Independence Day
Charles in Swingers
Calvin Andrews in Shanghai Noon
Jesse Ryan in The Rage: Carrie 2
Adam Louder in Models Inc.
Ronnie Gibson in The Recruit

References

External links

1966 births
2003 deaths
People from Cassino
Italian male voice actors
Italian male television actors
20th-century Italian male actors
21st-century Italian male actors
Road incident deaths in Italy